Pokémon Colosseum is a role-playing video game in the Pokémon series developed by Genius Sonority, published by The Pokémon Company, and distributed by Nintendo. It was released for the GameCube on November 21, 2003, in Japan; March 22, 2004, in North America; and May 14, 2004, in Europe. Unlike previous titles' random encounters with Pokémon, Colosseum allows the player to steal ("snag") the Pokémon of other Pokémon Trainers. The game also features single-player and multiplayer battle modes.

Set in the desert region of Orre, the player controls Wes, a former member of Team Snagem. Throughout the game, Wes rescues "Shadow Pokémon"—Pokémon who have had their hearts darkened by Team Cipher, an antagonistic organization—via snagging. Rui, a non-player character, serves as Wes's sidekick and identifies Shadow Pokémon.

Pokémon Colosseum was exhibited at E3 2003 and featured Pokémon models ported from the Nintendo 64's Pokémon Stadium and Pokémon Stadium 2. North American pre-orders included a bonus disc that allows the player to download the Pokémon Jirachi on the Game Boy Advance titles Pokémon Ruby and Sapphire while Japanese bonus discs featured similar downloads for Celebi and Pikachu. Upon release, the game was a critical and commercial success, with praise directed at its graphics and music. It sold 1.15 million copies in the United States and 656,270 in Japan. A successor, Pokémon XD: Gale of Darkness, released for the GameCube in 2005.

Gameplay

Pokémon Colosseum is a 3D role-playing game viewed from a third-person perspective. The player, controlling a Pokémon Trainer named Wes (default name), moves through various towns and other locations (traversed using a type of one-wheeled motorcycle), battling enemy Trainers and completing quests. Items are purchased at "Pokémon Mart" locations using the game's currency, "Pokémon Dollars". When a battle starts, the screen switches to a turn-based interface where the player's and enemies' Pokémon fight. Most battles are of the "double battle" format, which means two Pokémon on each side at one time. However, each Trainer can carry up to six Pokémon at one time, so once a Pokémon is defeated, his or her Trainer must switch out another one unless no more are left. Battles are also conducted at "Colosseums" in several cities.

Unlike most Pokémon games, Colosseum does not feature random encounters. The player begins the game with two Pokémon. More are obtained throughout the game by "Snagging" them from other Trainers using Poké Balls of various strengths. Only specifically designated "Shadow Pokémon", whose hearts have been artificially closed, can be Snagged. Pokémon can be traded between Colosseum and the Game Boy Advance games Ruby, Sapphire, FireRed, LeafGreen and Emerald.

Each of the player's Shadow Pokémon has a purple gauge that is drained by battling and coming to like the player. Once a Pokémon's gauge is empty, the player may "Purify" the Pokémon by bringing him or her to Celebi's shrine in Agate Village, or by using a rare "Time Flute" item. Purifying Shadow Pokémon is desirable because while in that status, they will often disobey the player, they cannot gain experience points, and their moves are at first restricted to "Shadow Rush". Additionally, Shadow Pokémon will sporadically enter "Hyper Mode" state during battle, causing them to disobey the player character or attack themselves until the condition is alleviated by selecting the "Call" battle command.

Aside from the story mode, Colosseum also features several non-canonical battle modes. In the "Quick Battle" mode, the player can battle either CPU trainers or friends, using Pokémon obtained in the story mode or randomly assigned ones. Battles in this mode do not result in gain of experience points or money. In the single-player battle mode, the player competes at Colosseums—stadiums used throughout the game for Pokémon battles—and earns "Poké Coupons", another currency which can be used to buy rare items. In the "Gang Battle" mode, up to four players can compete in a tournament. The first can use Pokémon obtained in the story mode, or from the Game Boy Advance games. Players two through four, however, can only use Pokémon from the Game Boy Advance games.

Plot

Setting
Pokémon Colosseum is set in the Orre region. Orre is a mostly desertous region in which no wild Pokémon can be found (although the sequel, Pokémon XD: Gale of Darkness, adds wild Pokémon spots to the region). Orre consists of many cities, towns, and Colosseums.

Characters

The game's player protagonist is by default named , but as with most Pokémon games, the player can change his name. Wes's Starter Pokémon are Espeon and Umbreon, two fox-like Pokémon who start at level 25 and 26, respectively. Additionally, shortly after the game begins, the player meets the game's partner character, Rui; she accompanies Wes on his journey, and uses her ability to see shadow Pokémon to help combat the efforts of the game's villains. , a criminal organization that uses the "Snag machine" technology to capture the Pokémon of Trainers, serves as an antagonistic entity in the game. However, shortly after the game's start,  is revealed to be the main antagonistic force, having partnered with Snagem to obtain Pokémon from Trainers, corrupting them, and distributing them throughout Cipher and other places such as Pyrite Town. Wes is a former employee of Team Snagem. The organization also employs many grunt workers, as well as four administrators: disco-loving , the explosively-tempered bodybuilder, the queen of the Under, and the strategist of a scientist, .

Story
The game begins with a cold open in which Wes infiltrates and destroys the Team Snagem hideout before leaving the organization. Wes starts at the Outskirt Stand, a dilapidated train engine in the middle of the desert that has been converted into a shop. With Espeon and Umbreon, Wes's first opponent is a Trainer named Willie. Wes then leaves the Stand and heads to the oasis-esque Phenac City in time to see two men dragging a sack. After defeating them in battle, Wes unties the sack to find Rui, a girl with the ability to discern Shadow Pokémon. They meet the mayor, Es Cade, who seems very bothered about the Cipher problem, but seems to do nothing about it. Later, upon leaving Phenac Colosseum, three Snagem grunts find Wes and Rui. The grunts then reveal to Rui that he was a member of Snagem, and an excellent Snagger. Wes then confronts one of the grunts, which results in the latter's defeat. Finding out that he is an expert at snagging Pokémon, Rui asks him to join forces with her in finding and snagging Shadow Pokémon.

As the game progresses, Wes becomes a target of a powerful organization known as Team Cipher. After leaving Phenac, he visits Pyrite Town, where Rui was kidnapped. In Pyrite, Shadow Pokémon are openly offered to winners of the town's Colosseum tournament. The local police force is powerless to stop the practice, so Duking, an influential man in Pyrite, asks Wes to enter the tournament and investigate. Wes enters the Colosseum challenge and defeats four trainers to win. Inside a nearby building, a Cipher Peon is about to present the Shadow Pokémon prize, but another one recognizes Wes. The pair then battle their way through the building and a maze-like cave set in the rock behind. Eventually, they face and defeat Miror B., one of four Cipher Admins. Afterwards, Wes returns a Pokémon Miror B. stole from Duking. A team of kids working in Duking's house introduce themselves as members of an anti-Cipher news network, known as the Kids Grid, who pledge their help to Wes and Rui.

Their next stop is Agate Village, a forested village in the mountains. As Rui introduces Wes to her grandfather Eagun, another villager runs into the room, telling them that the Relic Stone—a shrine protected by Celebi—is under attack. Wes, following Eagun to the center of the tree, fights off four Cipher agents before the Relic Stone is safe. After resting, Wes is given access to the Relic Stone, the only place where he can purify Shadow Pokémon. After receiving an e-mail from Duking about Mt. battle being under attack by Cipher, Rui asks Eagun where it is and the two headed over there.

Upon reaching Mt. Battle, people inform Wes and Rui that Cipher has already taken over the first section of the mountain. After battling nine other Trainers, Wes battles the Cipher administrator Dakim. Dakim owns a Shadow Entei, who is one of the trio of legendary beasts. After defeating Dakim, Wes heads to The Under, which is an underground city located underneath Pyrite Town, and under the control of Cipher. More members of the Kids Grid are here. They tell the player of Venus, another Cipher administrator, who has influence over The Under. After Wes confronts Venus, the owner of the second legendary beast Suicune, she flees. Next, Wes and Rui head to the Shadow Pokémon Lab, where Pokémon are transformed into Shadow Pokémon. After defeating numerous Cipher peons, Wes faces Ein, the final Cipher administrator and the owner of the final legendary beast Raikou.

Wes and Rui then go to Realgam Tower. All four administrators are there and ready to face Wes again. After doing so, he is granted access to the Colosseum at the top of the building. There, he is greeted by a large crowd. A Cipher man named Nascour tells Wes that he will have to face four trainers. After Wes defeats all four trainers, Nascour fights him. Once defeated, Nascour tries to leave, only to be interrupted by Es Cade. Es Cade reveals that he is really none other than Evice, the head of Cipher, and battles Wes. When Wes defeats him, Evice attempts to escape by helicopter, but the legendary Pokémon Ho-Oh swoops in and blasts it out of the sky. Evice and Nascour are sent to jail.

Development and release
Pokémon Colosseum was developed by the Japanese game developer Genius Sonority, and published by Nintendo. Just as Nintendo 64 predecessors Pokémon Stadium and Pokémon Stadium 2 had served as home console counterparts to the first- and second-generation handheld titles, Colosseum had a similar role for the third generation.

The new concept for Pokémon Colosseum was influenced by RPGs such as Final Fantasy VII and Persona 2 over the Pokémon mold. When asked in an interview with Prima Games why the gameplay of Colosseum did not mirror that of the handheld Pokémon games, Pokémon director Junichi Masuda explained: "How players communicate with each other has been key to the Pokémon games – it is the backbone of all Pokémon game designs. I feel that the handheld systems work better than the home-based consoles. It's certainly possible to come up with concepts for home-based consoles, but we might then have to change the core of the game."

The transition to 3D also brought new graphical changes. Wes was designed to look "hazy" and about 17 years old. Genius Sonority ported most of the models and animations of first- and second-generation Pokémon from Stadium and Stadium 2. Genius Sonority based most of Orre on the real-life city of Phoenix, Arizona. As a whole, the graphics were influenced more by manga than by established Pokémon convention.

A preview for the game was hosted at E3 2003. Upon completion of development, Colosseum received a rating of "E" (Everyone) from the Entertainment Software Rating Board, "All Ages" from Computer Entertainment Rating Organization, and "3+" from Pan European Game Information. The game was released on November 21, 2003, in Japan; March 22, 2004, in North America, and May 14, 2004, in Europe.

Nintendo also published supplementary media to unlock additional content. Pre-ordered copies of the game came with a bonus disc that contains trailers for the game and the film Pokémon: Jirachi Wish Maker. The North American disc also contains the exclusive Pokémon Jirachi that can be downloaded to the player's copy of Ruby or Sapphire. The Japanese release contains a downloadable Celebi instead and requires a completed save file of Pokémon Colosseum. The disc also updates the software in Ruby and Sapphire to remove a "berry glitch" discovered in 2003. Despite public anticipation the Bonus Disc was not released in PAL territories, prompting Nintendo to issue an official apology. However a Jirachi was later included in the PAL version of the game Pokémon Channel. In Japan, scannable cards for the Nintendo e-Reader were available for purchase that featured additional trainers to battle and capture Shadow Pokémon.

Reception

Critical response

Pokémon Colosseum was generally well-received upon release, with respective scores of 73/100 and 73.46% from aggregators Metacritic and GameRankings. Allgame staff writer Scott Alan Marriott gave the game three and a half stars out of five, although he did not review the game with more depth.

Critics praised Colosseum as the first true 3D role-playing installment in the Pokémon series and for its darker tone. Gamers Hell reviewer John K. called it "certainly a step in the right direction to a good 3D Pokémon game", although he felt that the limited number of Pokémon and lack of a true overworld detracted from the experience. IGN staff writer Craig Harris said that the adaptation of the Pokémon RPG formula to the 3D zeitgeist "does a decent enough job" and is "a bit more linear and straightforward".

The new 3D graphics received mixed remarks. Harris called the game "[g]raphically ... a mixed bag", praising the visual style of the game's Pokémon but criticizing the "poorly modeled and animated, angular" style of the Trainers. GameSpot reviewer Ryan Davis offered a similar opinion, concluding that "[t]he visual style ... has gone off the deep end". GamePro writer Star Dingo called the graphics as a whole "insanely cute" but criticized the lack of animations showing two Pokémon attacking in tandem. GameZone's review took a more positive stance, saying that "[a]nimations are brief but impressive; each attack move is more elaborate and more extravagant on the 'Cube." Nintendo Power thought similarly, commending the "amazing level of detail". Nimensio Rivera of the San Diego Union-Tribune praised the game for its gameplay, graphics and replay value, but criticized its sound, specifically its soundtrack which was described as “Saturday morning-ish.”

GameZone compared the overall town design and environments to those of the landmark Final Fantasy VII. Dingo complained that "there are some characters to talk to and chests to find, but no 'overworld' with free-roaming monsters to capture." John K. stated that "[t]he towns are made with enough detail, but sometimes a bit dull."

Harris denounced the game's usage of old Pokémon battle cries, a recurring complaint of the series. Dingo called the music as a whole "a bit too low-tech and synthetic". GameZone, in contrast, stated that the sound effects evoke nostalgia for Pokémon Red and Blue, and that the music tracks "have more depth than any of the songs from the previous  games." John K. said that the music is neither annoying nor entertaining. Retronauts described Colosseum as "terrible", citing the reuse of graphics from the Pokémon Stadium games.

In 2006, Nintendo Power listed Colosseum as the 121st greatest video game to appear on a Nintendo console.

Sales
Three weeks before its release, pre-orders of Pokémon Colosseum made it the best-selling game on Amazon.com. In the game's first week of release in the United Kingdom, it boosted the GameCube's market share from 16% to 32%. It was the best-selling GameCube game of May 2004, and fourteenth among all consoles. In 2005, the game was certified as part of Nintendo's Player's Choice line in North America, representing at least 250,000 copies sold. As of 2007, the game has sold over 1.15 million copies in the United States and 656,270 in Japan. It is the best-selling RPG for the GameCube.

Legacy
Pokémon Colosseum spawned a high-profile tournament in the United Kingdom entitled "Pokémon Colosseum Battlemaster 2004". The first round of battles was held at Toys "R" Us locations, with later battles taking place in movie theaters. Across Europe, the game was bundled with GameCube consoles shortly after its release. Special editions of this set also included a copy of Pokémon Box: Ruby and Sapphire
—a game that allows players to organize and store up to 1,500 Pokémon from their games—as well as a memory card and a Game Boy Advance–GameCube link cable.

A manga adaptation of Colosseums plot was printed in 2004 issues of the Japanese magazine CoroCoro Comic and titled . The game was followed by a 2005 sequel entitled Pokémon XD: Gale of Darkness. Set in Orre five years after Colosseum, it features a new protagonist snagging Shadow Pokémon from Team Cipher. Shadow Lugia is the game's mascot, and serves as an antagonist whom the player can snag. The game alludes to Wes, Rui, and The Under, though they do not appear.

Sequel

See also

 Pokémon Battle Revolution

Notes

References

External links

Role-playing video games
GameCube games
Video games developed in Japan
Video games set in Arizona
Video games scored by Tsukasa Tawada
GameCube-only games
Genius Sonority games
Colosseum
Multiplayer and single-player video games
2003 video games
Games with GameCube-GBA connectivity